Showtime, Storytime is a video release, released as a double Blu-ray, DVD, CD and LP from Finnish symphonic metal band Nightwish. Nuclear Blast recorded their live performance at Wacken Open Air in Wacken, Germany on 3 August 2013. Showtime, Storytime is the first Nightwish production to feature Floor Jansen on vocals. She initially replaced previous vocalist Anette Olzon during their North America tour leg, and on 9 October 2013 it was revealed that she would become an official band member, along with Troy Donockley. The running time of the concert is 1 hour and 38 minutes. The album also contains a 120-minute documentary about the first days of Jansen in the band, still as an only live member, and her process of adaptation in the band, called "Please Learn the Setlist in 48 Hours".

Track listing

Video disc 1

Bonus track

Video disc 2

Members
Floor Jansen – vocals
Tuomas Holopainen – keyboards
Emppu Vuorinen – guitars
Marko Hietala – bass guitar, clean male vocals (on tracks 2, 4, 5, 7, 11, 12, 14 & 15)
Jukka Nevalainen – drums
Troy Donockley – Uilleann pipes, flutes, additional vocals

Charts performance

References

External links
 Nightwish's Official Website

Nightwish video albums
Nightwish albums
2013 video albums
2013 live albums
Live video albums
Films shot in Germany